NGC 1728 is a spiral galaxy in the constellation Eridanus. The galaxy is listed in the New General Catalogue. It was discovered on November 10, 1885 by the astronomer Edward Emerson Barnard.

References

External links 
 

Eridanus (constellation)
Spiral galaxies
1728
016495